Daphnella tenuiclathrata is a species of sea snail, a marine gastropod mollusk in the family Raphitomidae.

Description
The length of the shell attains 14 mm, its diameter 5 mm.

The small, ovate shell is semi-translucent with very dilute golden yellow spots. It consists of about 9 whorls, of which three in the protoconch. The spiral lirations are very numerous and beautifully
minutely beaded. The aperture measures about half the total length of the shell. The outer lip is thin. It is deeply sinuate at the suture. The columella is wrinkled. The siphonal canal is short.

Distribution

References

External links
 

tenuiclathrata
Gastropods described in 1882